The 2019–20 Cayman Islands Premier League was the 41st season of the Cayman Islands Premier League, the top division football competition in the Cayman Islands. The season began on 19 October 2019. The season was indefinitely postponed on 12 March 2020, due to the Coronavirus pandemic. The season is resumed on 15 August. Bodden Town won their fourth league title.

League table

References

2019–20
2019–20 in Caribbean football leagues
Association football events postponed due to the COVID-19 pandemic